Ahmed Imtiaz Bulbul (1 January 1956 – 22 January 2019) was a Bangladeshi lyricist, composer and music director, active since the late 1970s. He was a freedom fighter who joined the Bangladesh Liberation War at the age of 15. He won Ekushey Padak and Bangladesh National Film Award for Best Music Director twice for the films Premer Taj Mahal 
(2001) and Hajar Bachhor Dhore (2005).

Early life 
Bulbul was born on 1 January 1956 in Dhaka. He studied at West End High School in Azimpur, Dhaka.

Career
Bulbul's compositions include a number of works for films, beginning with 1978's Megh Bijli Badol. 

He has also released independent albums and created works for a number of Bangladeshi performers, including Samina Chowdhury and Andrew Kishore. 

He was a judge on the talent show Closeup 1 Tomakei Khujchhe Bangladesh for three seasons.

Discography

Selected composed film songs

Bangladesh Liberation war 
Bulbul joined the Bangladesh Liberation war in 1971 when he was 15 years old. He served in a Mukti Bahini base in Zinzira. His older brother, Iftekhar Uddin Ahmed Tutul, served in the Crack Platoon of the Mukti Bahini. He trained in India and fought in Lalbagh Thana and New Market Thana of Dhaka. 

In October, he was captured by the Pakistan military and Razakars while returning to India for more training. He was transferred to a jail in Mymensingh, where he was tortured and witnessed the mass execution of 39 Mukti Bahini prisoners by the Pakistan military. He was transferred to the residence of Dana Miah, which served as the local office of the East Pakistan Central Peace Committee. He was tortured there along with other members of the Mukti Bahini. He was able to escape from the camp.

War crime witness
Bulbul testified against convicted former Jamaat chief Ghulam Azam in the International Crimes Tribunal. Following the testimony as a witness, Bulbul's younger brother was killed, and his dead body was found near the Kuril overpass in Dhaka. Bulbul urged the government to ensure his security after the murder of his brother. He said that he had received death threats several times.

Death
Bulbul was taken to Universal Medical College and Hospital in Dhaka around 6:15 am, where the doctors, after necessary tests, declared him dead. He had suffered cardiac arrest.

Awards

 Ekushey Padak (2010)
 Bangladesh National Film Award for Best Music Director (2001, 2005)
 President's Award
 Shikha Anirban Award (the highest honour conferred by the Bangladesh Armed Forces) 
 Bachsas Awards (11 times)

References 

1956 births
2019 deaths
Bangladeshi male musicians
 Recipients of the Ekushey Padak in arts
Best Music Director National Film Award (Bangladesh) winners
Crime witnesses